The Italian Federation of Postal and Telecommunication Workers (FILPT) was a trade union representing workers in the communications industry in Italy.

The union was founded in 1983, when the Italian Postal and Telecommunication Federation merged with the Italian Federation of Employees of Telephone Companies.  Like its predecessors, it affiliated to the Italian General Confederation of Labour.  By 1995, the union had 41,956 members.

In 1996, the union merged with the Italian Federation of Information and Entertainment Workers, to form the Communication Workers' Union.

General Secretaries
1983: Gianfranco Testi
1990: Carmelo Romeo

References

Communications trade unions
Trade unions established in 1983
Trade unions disestablished in 1996
Trade unions in Italy